La Unión District may refer to:

 Peru:
 La Unión District, Piura, in Piura province, Piura region
 La Unión District, Dos de Mayo, in Dos de Mayo province, Huánuco region
 La Unión District, Tarma, in Tarma province, Junín region
 Costa Rica:
 La Unión District, Montes de Oro, in Montes de Oro Canton, Puntarenas province

See also
 La Unión

District name disambiguation pages